The Suburban Fleet (also known as pierced bellies) were passenger railcars used by the Turkish State Railways on their suburban rail operations mainly in Istanbul, Ankara and İzmir. Those cars are kept in the depots as a last resort in emergencies.

References

Turkish State Railways
Fleet
Turkish State Railways Railway coaches